Styx was is a video game released by Windmill Software in 1983 as a copy-protected, bootable 5.25" floppy disk for the IBM PC/XT. It is a clone of the 1981 arcade game Qix.

Gameplay

There are three significant differences from Qix: the caterpillar (that can grow in size in later rounds), the introduction of diagonal movement, and the X1/X5/X10 multiplier that would color a claimed area corresponding to the color of the multiplier (also awarding that many points).

Development

Styx uses the same game engine as two other Windmill Software games, The Exterminator and Moonbugs, and these were some of the few programs to make use of the 16-color quasi-graphics CGA mode (normally the CGA could only use 4 or 2 color graphics). However, it was possible to play on a monochrome monitor as long as the graphics card also supported color graphics (e.g. a Genoa Color Graphics Card).

Styx, The Exterminator, and Moonbugs set CGA 320x200x4 mode on the title screen by directly manipulating the video registers; this causes them to display a screen full of garbage on later video cards. The in-game graphics also will only occupy half the screen due to technical differences between CGA and EGA/VGA, however the games can be patched to work correctly on VGA.

Legacy
In September 2004 the source code of the game became available "for historical interest" (with other Windmill Software games such as Digger). Also, there is a reverse engineered variant from Andrew Jenner, called Styx Remastered.

References

External links

Video game clones
1983 video games
Video games developed in Canada
Puzzle video games
Action video games
Windmill Software games
Commercial video games with freely available source code
Single-player video games